Jürgen Bartsch (born Karl-Heinz Sadrozinski; November 6, 1946 – April 28, 1976) was a West German serial killer who murdered four boys aged between 8 and 13 and attempted to kill a fifteen year old boy. The case of this sexual offender was the first in German jurisdiction history to include psycho-social factors of the defendant, who came from a violent early surrounding, to set down the degree of penalty.

Early life
Bartsch was born an illegitimate child whose birth mother died of tuberculosis five months after his birth, and so he spent the first months of his life being cared for by nurses.  At 11 months he was adopted by a butcher and his wife in Langenberg (today Velbert-Langenberg), who gave him the name Jürgen Bartsch. Bartsch's adoptive mother, who suffered from obsessive-compulsive disorder, was fixated on cleanliness. He was not permitted to play with other children, lest he become dirty. This continued into adulthood; his mother personally bathed him until he was 19. At the age of 10, Bartsch entered school. Because, in his parents' opinion, it was not sufficiently strict, he was moved to a Catholic boarding school.

Bartsch was physically abused as a baby and was often discovered with visible scars and bruises. His mother also physically beat him, often in the same room where his father, the butcher, cut up carcasses. He was detained in an underground cellar for six years and was also sexually abused by his mother during bathing sessions. Bartsch was sexually abused by his thirteen-year old cousin when he was only eight years old and was also later abused by his teacher when he was thirteen years old.

Murders
Bartsch began killing at the age of fifteen. His first victim was Klaus Jung who was murdered in 1962. His next victim was Peter Fuchs who was killed three years later in 1965. He persuaded all of his victims to accompany him into an abandoned air-raid shelter, where he forced them to undress and then sexually abused them. He dismembered his first four victims. His intended fifth victim, 15-year-old Peter Frese, however, escaped by burning through his bindings with a candle that Bartsch had left burning after leaving the shelter that he has been keeping his victims in. Bartsch was arrested in 1966.

Sentence
Upon arrest, Bartsch openly confessed to his crimes. He was sentenced to life imprisonment on December 15, 1967, by the Wuppertal regional court (Landgericht Wuppertal). Initially, the sentence was upheld on appeal. However, in 1971, the Federal Court of Justice of Germany, returned the case to the Landgericht Düsseldorf, which reduced the sentence to 10 years of juvenile detention and had Bartsch placed under psychiatric care in Eickelborn. There, he married Gisela Deike of Hanover on January 2, 1974.

Death
The forensic psychiatrists considered various therapy concepts: psychotherapy, castration and even psychosurgery. Bartsch initially refused any surgery but finally agreed to voluntary castration on April 28, 1976 in order to avoid lifetime incarceration in a mental hospital. This was about ten years after incarceration, two years after his marriage, and after his depressive condition did not improve. The doctors of Eickelborn State Hospital chose a castration methodology that accidentally resulted in Bartsch's death. An official autopsy and investigation determined that Bartsch had been intoxicated with a halothane overdose (factor 10) due to a mistake during surgery.

Victims
March 31, 1962: Klaus Jung, 8
August 7, 1965: Peter Fuchs, 13
August 7, 1965: Ulrich Kahlweiss, 12
May 6, 1966: Manfred Grassmann, 12
June 18, 1966: Peter Frese, 15 (escaped)

Influence
The 2002 film Ein Leben lang kurze Hosen tragen (released in the U.S. in 2004, as The Child I Never Was) depicts Bartsch's life and crimes.

Bartsch is referenced in Elfriede Jelinek's novel Die Kinder der Toten as someone who had no difficulty dismembering his victims.

See also
Anísio Ferreira de Sousa
List of German serial killers

References

Alice Miller, Am Anfang war Erziehung (English title: For Your Own Good), Suhrkamp, 1983, 
Paul Moor, Jürgen Bartsch: Opfer und Täter, Rowohlt, 1991, 

1946 births
1976 deaths
20th-century German criminals
Accidental deaths in Germany
Drug-related deaths in Germany
Criminals from North Rhine-Westphalia
German adoptees
German murderers of children
German people convicted of murder
German rapists
German serial killers
Male serial killers
Murder committed by minors
People convicted of murder by Germany
People from Essen
Violence against men in Europe